Cuba is the second album by the American alternative rock band the Silos, released in 1987.

Production
Although incorrectly credited on some pressings of the album, lead guitarist Bob Rupe re-recorded all of Rick Wagner's bass parts after Wagner left the band. A video was made for "Tennessee Fire", which became a hit on MTV.

Critical reception

Trouser Press wrote that the album "finds Mary Rowell’s violin emerging as an integral element in the Silos’ sound." The Chicago Reader thought that "there's a sober, even slightly ominous undercurrent to these matter-of-factly domestic songs." The New York Times opined that "[Walter] Salas-Humara takes a longer view of relationships than most pop songwriters ... from low-key stories, the Silos draw rock epiphanies." The Chicago Sun-Times declared the album to be "the finest independently released rock album in '87."

AllMusic called the album "something of a low-flying classic," writing that "lyrics like 'Margaret goes to bed around eight/I go to bed around one' capture something elusive with small, everyday details." The Pitch deemed it a "masterwork," writing that it "is thought by some to be the holy grail of the alt-country movement."

Track listing

Personnel
John Galway - drums
Mary Rowell - violin
Bob Rupe - guitar, bass
Walter Salas-Humara - guitar, vocals

References

1987 albums